The list of shipwrecks in June 1827 includes some ships sunk, wrecked or otherwise lost during June 1827.

1 June

2 June

3 June

4 June

5 June

6 June

7 June

18 June

22 June

25 June

28 June

29 June

30 June

Unknown date

References

1827-06